Saint-Paul-de-Jarrat (Languedocien: Sent Pau de Jarrat) is a commune in the Ariège department in southwestern France.

Population
Inhabitants of Saint-Paul-de-Jarrat are called Saint-Paulois.

See also
Communes of the Ariège department

References

Communes of Ariège (department)
Ariège communes articles needing translation from French Wikipedia